Ralf Hantschke (born 27 May 1965) is a German former ice hockey player and the current general manager of the Lausitzer Füchse.

Career
Hantschke began his career in 1984, playing for SG Dynamo Weißwasser in the DDR-Oberliga. He won the Oberliga with his team in 1989 and 1990. Following the Reunification of Germany in 1990, Hantschke played for PEV Weißwasser in the Eishockey-Bundesliga. Hantschke played for them until 1992, when he joined EV Landshut. For Landshut, he played two seasons in the Bundesliga and two more in the Deutsche Eishockey Liga (which had replaced the Bundesliga as the top-level German league in 1994). Hantschke then joined the Newcastle Cobras of the British Ice Hockey Superleague for the 1996-97 season, before returning to the DEL with the Frankfurt Lions the following season. He retired after the 2003-04 season spent with EHC Leipziger Eislöwen in the fourth-level Regionalliga.

International
Hantschke played for the East Germany national ice hockey team in the top-level World Championships in 1985, as well as in the B Pool in 1986, 1987, 1989, and 1990.

References

External links
Profile on eliteprospects.com

1965 births
Living people
German ice hockey right wingers
Frankfurt Lions players
Newcastle Cobras players
EV Landshut players
Lausitzer Füchse players
People from Bad Muskau
Sportspeople from Saxony